Uitdam is a village in the Dutch province of North Holland. It is a part of the municipality of Waterland, and lies on the coast of the IJsselmeer, about 12 km northeast of Amsterdam.

The village was first mentioned in 1345 as Udam, and means "damn outside the dike". Uitdam and neighbouring Zuiderwoude formed a heerlijkheid in 1628 which existed until 1811. Uitdam was home to 88 people in 1840. The first church was built in the 17th century. The current church dates from 1937.

Gallery

References

Populated places in North Holland
Waterland